Hussein Issam Hamdan (born 22 August 1978) is a Lebanese football coach and former player who is the head coach of  club Akhaa Ahli Aley.

Honours

Player
Individual
 Lebanese Premier League Team of the Season: 2006–07

Manager
Akhaa Ahli Aley
 Lebanese Challenge Cup: 2022

References

External links
 
 
 

1978 births
Living people
Footballers from Beirut
Lebanese footballers
Association football midfielders
Sagesse SC footballers
Al Ansar FC players
Nejmeh SC players
Lebanese Premier League players
Lebanon international footballers
Association football coaches
Lebanese football managers
Akhaa Ahli Aley FC managers